GS Caltex Seoul KIXX is a South Korean women's volleyball team. The team is based in Seoul and plays in the V-League. It is currently owned by GS Sports and the main sponsor is GS Caltex, a subsidiary of GS Group. The club was founded in 1970 as Honam Petrochemical Volleyball Team.

Honours

Domestic

 Korea Volleyball Super League
 Champions (9): 1991, 1992, 1993, 1994, 1995, 1996, 1997, 1998, 1999
 Runners-up (3): 1988, 2000, 2001

V-League
Champions (3): 2007−08, 2013−14, 2020–21
 Runners-up (2): 2008−09, 2012−13

 KOVO Cup
 Winners (5): 2007, 2012, 2017, 2020, 2022
 Runners-up (3): 2014, 2018, 2021

Continental
 AVC Club Volleyball Championship
 Winners: 1999

Season-by-season records

Players

2021−22 team

See also 
GS Caltex

References

External links 
  

 
Volleyball clubs established in 1970
Sport in Seoul
GS Group
Women's volleyball teams in South Korea
1970 establishments in South Korea